Optalert is an Australian business founded by sleep expert Dr Murray Johns  who invented a personal safety device for transport workers to detect and prevent drowsy driving.

Fatigue monitoring systems
Optalert's fatigue monitoring system uses infra-red light to measures a driver’s levels of alertness continuously and objectively in real time. It is the first validated system that provides early warning signs of drowsiness.
It includes a pair of glasses connected to a small computer processor in the vehicle. The glasses emit and detect low levels of infrared light to sense movements in the eyes and eyelids. These movements are fed into a computer that measures a driver's drowsiness and sounds an alarm when the movements show the driver is becoming drowsy.

Scientific validation
Optalert's technology has been scientifically validated by Monash University Accident Research Centre (MUARC) to prove its accuracy and reliability.
Universities in Sweden and Professor Charles Czeisler from Harvard Medical School have also published articles validating the technology.

Use
Optalert supplies transport and mining companies in Asia, Africa, South America and Australia including BHP, Toll, BIS Industries, Oz Minerals, WestNet Energy and Sutherland’s Transport.

Optalert Reports
The company has launched a service called Optalert Reports. It takes information from an onboard computer connected to a driver’s glasses to create an activity summary and travel log over a period of days or months. It can be used to identify potential risks and plan work schedules based on avoiding risk.

Awards
Optalert won an Australian Design Mark in the 2007 Australian Design Award.
It was a finalist in the 4th Annual Australian Mining Prospect Awards.

Optalert also received a Bronze in the Industrial Designers Society of America (IDSA's) International Design Excellence Awards 2007.

References

External links
 http://www.optalert.com

Biotechnology companies of Australia
Driving